2017 college football season may refer to:

American leagues
2017 NCAA Division I FBS football season
2017 NCAA Division I FCS football season
2017 NCAA Division II football season
2017 NCAA Division III football season
2017 NAIA football season

Non-American leagues
2017 Japan college football season
2017 CIS football season